Khusayin Norchaev (Uzbek Cyrillic: Хусайин Норчаев; born 6 February 2002) is an Uzbek professional footballer who plays as a forward for Russian club Alania Vladikavkaz.

Club career
On June 14, 2020, he made his debut in the Super League of Uzbekistan in a duel against Navbakhor (2:2), replacing Oybek Bozorov in the 84th minute.

Career

International
He made his debut for main team, Uzbekistan on 19 October 2021 in a friendly match against Malaysia.

Statistics accurate as of match played 9 October 2021.

International goalsScores and results list Uzbekistan's goal tally first.''

Honours
Nasaf
AFC Cup: runner-up 2021
Individual
2021 AFC Cup Top scorer (7 goals)

References

2002 births
People from Qashqadaryo Region
Living people
Uzbekistani footballers
Uzbekistan youth international footballers
Uzbekistan international footballers
Association football forwards
FC Nasaf players
Uzbekistan Super League players
Uzbekistani expatriate footballers
Expatriate footballers in Russia
Uzbekistani expatriate sportspeople in Russia